Judith S. Eisen is an American neuroscientist and professor of biology at the University of Oregon. Eisen conducts fundamental research in the specification and patterning of the vertebrate nervous system with a focus on developmental interactions between the nervous system, immune system, and host-associated microbiota. Eisen is a member of the Institute of Neuroscience at the University of Oregon.

Education and career
Eisen received a BS in botany in 1973 and an MS in Cell and Developmental Biology in 1977, both  from Utah State University.  She received her PhD in neurobiology from Brandeis University in 1982, where she worked in the lab of Eve Marder. She was a postdoctoral fellow in neurobiology at Brandeis from 1982–1983.

Eisen started her career at the University of Oregon in 1983 as a postdoctoral fellow in the lab of Monte Westerfield. She joined the faculty in 1985 as an assistant professor and is currently a professor in the Department of Biology and a member of the Institute of Neuroscience.

Eisen and the members of her lab are interested in discovering how cells become committed to differentiate their specific properties during embryonic development. They have focused their attention on neurons and neural crest cells in embryonic zebrafish.  Eisen was the first person to describe individually identified vertebrate spinal motoneurons. More recently she demonstrated requirements for the enteric nervous system to regulate bacterial competition and composition within the intestinal microbiota and how changes in the microbiota positively and negatively impact intestinal health. Eisen has published over 150 scientific papers with over 8800 citations, according to ResearchGate.

She served as director of the Institute of Neuroscience from 2004 to 2007. In 2004, she joined the editorial team of the journal Development for advances in developmental biology and stem cells as the 'zebrafish' editor. Shes has served on the editorial boards of Neural Development (2006–2019) and Zebrafish (2008–present). She was an editor of the volume The zebrafish in biomedical research: biology, husbandry, diseases, and research applications.

Honors and awards
 1983–1985   Muscular Dystrophy Association Postdoctoral Fellowship 
 1986–1989  Searle Scholar 
 1991–1995   National Science Foundation Presidential Young Investigator Award 
 1991–1995  National Institutes of Health Research Career Development Award 
 1996–1997  Burroughs Wellcome Travel Fellowship 
 1996–1997  Fogarty Senior International Fellowship 
 1997–1998  National Institutes of Health Senior Fellowship 
 2008–2010 Foundation Faculty Excellence Fellowship 
 2010–2011 John Simon Guggenheim Memorial Foundation Fellowship  
 2015    Association for the Study of Food and Society 2015 Pedagogy Award for "Bread 101" 
 2015    University of Oregon Thomas F. Herman excellence in pedagogy award 
 2015    Medical Research Foundation of Oregon's Discovery Award 
 2017–   Rowland Distinguished Visiting Scholar at Harvard University 
 2017–   Fellow, American Association for the Advancement of Science   
 2018–   Fellow, American Academy of Arts and Sciences 
 2018    University of Oregon Center for Undergraduate Research and Engagement Inaugural Faculty Research Mentor Award  
 2018   University of Oregon Outstanding Career Award   
 2018–2019 University of Oregon Faculty Excellence Award   
 2020–2024 Gordon and Betty Moore Symbiosis in Aquatic Systems Investigator  
 2020–2021 University of Oregon Wayne Morse Center for Law and Politics Distinguished Scholar

References

External links
 University of Oregon Biology Department profile
 University of Oregon Institute of Neuroscience profile
 ZFIN Profile

Living people
Brandeis University alumni
University of Oregon faculty
Fellows of the American Academy of Arts and Sciences
Fellows of the American Association for the Advancement of Science
American neuroscientists
20th-century American women scientists
21st-century American women scientists
American women neuroscientists
1951 births